Trifolium bifidum is a species of clover known by the common names notchleaf clover and pinole clover. It is native to the western United States from Washington to California, where it grows in many types of habitat. It is an annual herb spreading or growing erect in form. It is lightly hairy to hairless in texture. The leaves are made up of oval leaflets 1 to 2 centimeters long, usually with notches in the tips. The inflorescence is a head of flowers up to 1.5 centimeters wide. Each flower has a calyx of sepals that narrow to bristles covered in long hairs. The flower corolla is yellowish, pinkish, or purple and under a centimeter long. The flowers droop on the head as they age.

Subspecies

Trifolium bifidum  is often discussed as comprising two varieties.  These are:

T. bifidum var. bifidum
T. bifidum var. decipiens

References

External links
Jepson Manual Treatment
Photo gallery

bifidum
Flora of California
Flora of Oregon
Flora of Washington (state)
Flora without expected TNC conservation status